Major Sir John Dearman Birchall TD (26 September 1875 – 6 January 1941) was a British soldier and Conservative Party politician. Son of Dearman Birchall (1828-1897), he was elected as Member of Parliament (MP) for Leeds North East at the 1918 general election, and held his seat in the House of Commons for 22 years until he resigned on 8 February 1940 through appointment as Steward of the Chiltern Hundreds.

References

External links 

 

1875 births
1941 deaths
Conservative Party (UK) MPs for English constituencies
UK MPs 1918–1922
UK MPs 1922–1923
UK MPs 1923–1924
UK MPs 1924–1929
UK MPs 1929–1931
UK MPs 1931–1935
UK MPs 1935–1945
Royal Gloucestershire Hussars officers
Imperial Yeomanry officers
Church Estates Commissioners